John Haley "Zoot" Sims (October 29, 1925 – March 23, 1985) was an American jazz saxophonist, playing mainly tenor but also alto (and, later, soprano) saxophone. He first gained attention in the "Four Brothers" sax section of Woody Herman's big band, afterward enjoying a long solo career, often in partnership with fellow saxmen Gerry Mulligan and Al Cohn.

Biography
Sims was born in 1925 in Inglewood, California, United States, to vaudeville performers Kate Haley and John Sims. His father was a vaudeville hoofer, and Sims prided himself on remembering many of the steps his father taught him. Growing up in a performing family, he learned to play drums and clarinet at an early age. His brother was the trombonist Ray Sims.

Sims began on tenor saxophone at age 13. He initially modelled his playing on the work of Lester Young, Ben Webster, and Don Byas. By his late teens, having dropped out of high school, he was playing in big bands, starting with those of Kenny Baker and Bobby Sherwood. He joined Benny Goodman's band for the first time in 1943 (he was to rejoin in 1946, and continued to perform with Goodman on occasion through the early 1970s). Sims replaced Ben Webster in Sid Catlett's Quartet of 1944. In May 1944, Sims made his recording debut for Commodore Records in a sextet led by pianist Joe Bushkin, who two months earlier had recorded for the same label as part of Lester Young's Kansas City Six.

Sims served as a corporal in the United States Army Air Force from 1944 to 1946, then returned to music in the bands of Artie Shaw, Stan Kenton, and Buddy Rich. He was one of Woody Herman's "Four Brothers". From 1954–1956 he toured with his friend Gerry Mulligan's sextet, and in the early 1960s, with Mulligan's Concert Jazz Band. Sims played on some of Jack Kerouac's recordings. From the late 1950s to the end of his life, Sims was primarily a freelancer, though he worked frequently in the 1960s and early 1970s with a group co–led with Al Cohn. In the 1970s and 1980s, he also played and recorded regularly with a handful of other musical partners including Bucky Pizzarelli, Joe Venuti, and Jimmy Rowles. In 1975, he began recording for Norman Granz's Pablo Records label. Sims appeared on more than 20 Pablo albums, mostly as a featured solo artist, but also as a backing musician for artists including Count Basie, Sarah Vaughan, and Clark Terry. Between 1974 and 1983, Sims recorded six studio albums with pianist Jimmy Rowles in a quartet setting that critic Scott Yanow wrote feature Sims at his best.

Sims acquired the nickname "Zoot" early in his career while he was in the Kenny Baker band in California. "When he joined Kenny Baker's band as a fifteen-year-old tenor saxophonist, each of the music stands was embellished with a nonsense word. The one he sat behind said 'Zoot.' That became his name."

Sims played a 30-second solo on the song "Poetry Man", written by singer Phoebe Snow on her debut eponymous album in 1974. He also played on Laura Nyro's "Lonely Women", on her album Eli and the Thirteenth Confession.

Sims' last studio recording was a November, 1984 trio session featuring bassist Red Mitchell, recorded in Sweden and released in 1985 by Sonet records. Zoot Sims died of lung cancer on March 23, 1985 in New York City, and was buried in Oak Hill Cemetery, in Nyack, New York.

Discography

1949–1955 
 1950: The Zoot Sims Quartet in Paris (Discovery, 1950)
 1950–51: Swinging with Zoot (Prestige, 1951)
 1950–51: Tenor Sax Favorites (Prestige, 1951)
 1949–52: The Brothers (Prestige, 1956) with Stan Getz
 1952: Contemporary Music as Zoot Sims All Stars (Prestige, 1953) – also released as Zoot Sims All Stars (Esquire)
 1950–54: Zoot Sims Quintet (Prestige, 1954) with Stu Williamson – reissued as Good Old Zoot (New Jazz, 1962)(LP)
 1950–54: Zootcase (Prestige, 1975)(2 LP)
 1954?: Zoot Simms In Hollywood (New Jazz, 1954)
 1954: Happy Minors (Bethlehem, 1955) with Red Mitchell, Bob Brookmeyer
 1955: Playing as Hall Daniels' Septet (Jump, 1955) – reissued as Nash–Ville (Zim, 1977) with Dick Nash

1956–1959 
 1956: The Modern Art of Jazz by Zoot Sims (Dawn, 1956)
 1956: From A to...Z (RCA Victor, 1957) with Al Cohn
 1956: Tonite's Music Today (Storyville, 1956) with Bob Brookmeyer
 1956: Whooeeee (Storyville, 1956) with Bob Brookmeyer
 1956: Zoot Sims Avec Henri Renaud Et Son Orchestre Et Jon Eardley (Ducretet–Thomson, 1956) with Henri Renaud Et Son Orchestre and Jon Eardley
 1956: Zoot (Argo Records, 1957)
 1956: Zoot! (Riverside, 1957)
 1956: Tenor Conclave (Prestige, 1957) with John Coltrane, Al Cohn, Hank Mobley, Red Garland, Paul Chambers and Art Taylor 
 1956: Goes to Jazzville (Dawn, 1957)
 1956: Live at Falcon Lair (Pablo, 2004) with Joe Castro Trio
 1956: Zoot Sims Plays Alto, Tenor, and Baritone (ABC–Paramount, 1957)
 1956–57: Bohemia After Dark (Jazz Hour, 1994)
 1957: The Four Brothers... Together Again! (Vik, 1957) with Herbie Steward  et al.
 1957: Al and Zoot (Coral, 1957) with Al Cohn
 1957: Locking Horns (Rama, 1957) with Joe Newman
 1957–58: Happy Over Hoagy (Jass, 1987) with Al Cohn Septet – complete session plus 1961 live date with Mose Allison was released as The Hoagy Carmichael Sessions And More (Lone Hill Jazz, 2004)
 1958: Stretching Out (United Artists, 1959) with Bob Brookmeyer et al. 
 1954–59: Choice (Pacific Jazz, 1961)

 1959: Jazz Alive! A Night at the Half Note  (United Artists, 1959) with Al Cohn and Phil Woods – live
 1959?: A Gasser! (World Pacific, 1959) with Annie Ross

1960–1969 
 1959–60: Either Way (Fred Miles, 1961) with Al Cohn
 1960: You 'n' Me (Mercury, 1960) with Al Cohn
 1960: Down Home (Bethlehem, 1960)
 1961: Either Way (Fred Miles Presents, 1961) with Al Cohn
 1961: Zoot at Ronnie Scott's (Fontana, 1962)
 1961: Solo for Zoot (Fontana, 1962)
 1962?: New Beat Bossa Nova Means The Samba Swings (Colpix, 1962)
 1962?: New Beat Bossa Nova Vol. 2 (Colpix, 1962)
 1964: Two Jims and Zoot (Mainstream, 1964) with Jimmy Raney and Jim Hall – also released as Outra Vez
 1965: Inter-Action (Cadet, 1965) with Sonny Stitt
 1965: Suitably Zoot (Pumpkin, 1979)
 1965: Al and Zoot in London (World Record Club, 1967) with Al Cohn
 1965: At the Half Note Again – not officially released
 1966: Waiting Game (Impulse!, 1966)
 1967: The Greatest Jazz Concert in the World (Pablo, 1975)
 1968: Easy as Pie: Live at the Left Bank (Label M, 2001) with Al Cohn

1970–1979 
 1973: Body and Soul (Muse, 1973) with Al Cohn
 1973: Zoot Suite (High Note, 2007) – live audience recording 
 1973: Joe & Zoot (Chiaroscuro, 1974) with Joe Venuti – expanded reissue as Joe & Zoot & More (Chiaroscuro, 2002)
 1974: Zoot Sims' Party (Choice, 1974) – released as Getting Sentimental (Candid, 1997) on CD
 1974: Nirvana (Groove Merchant, 1974) with Bucky Pizzarelli and special guest Buddy Rich – reissued as Somebody Loves Me (Lester Recording Catalog, 2003)
 1974: Strike Up the Band (Flying Dutchman, 1975) with Bobby Hackett and Bucky Pizzarelli
 1974: Dave McKenna Quartet Featuring Zoot Sims (Chiaroscuro, 1974) with Dave McKenna – reissued in 1994 on CD with four extra tracks
 1974: Motoring Along (Sonet, 1975) with Al Cohn and Horace Parlan
 1975: Basie & Zoot (Pablo, 1975) with Count Basie
 1975: Zoot Sims and the Gershwin Brothers (Pablo, 1975) with Oscar Peterson and Joe Pass
 1975 The Tenor Giants Featuring Oscar Peterson (Pablo, 1975) and Eddie "Lockjaw" Davis
 1976: Zoot Sims With Bucky Pizzarelli (Classic Jazz, 1976) with Bucky Pizzarelli – also released as Summon
 1976: Soprano Sax (Pablo, 1976) with Ray Bryant and George Mraz
 1976: Hawthorne Nights (Pablo, 1977) 
 1977: If I'm Lucky (Pablo, 1977) with Jimmy Rowles
 1978: For Lady Day (Pablo, 1991) with Jimmy Rowles
 1978: Zoot Sims in Copenhagen (Storyville, 1995)
 1978: Just Friends (Pablo, 1980) with Harry Edison
 1978: Warm Tenor (Pablo, 1979) with Jimmy Rowles
 1978: The Sweetest Sounds (Sonet Gramofon/Pablo Today, 1979) with Rune Gustafsson

1980–1985 
 1979–80: The Swinger (Pablo, 1981)
 1979–80: Passion Flower: Zoot Sims Plays Duke Ellington (Pablo, 1980)
 1981: I Wish I Were Twins (Pablo, 1981) with Jimmy Rowles
 1981: Art 'n' Zoot (Pablo, 1995) with Art Pepper
 1982: The Innocent Years (Pablo, 1982) as The Zoot Sims Four
 1982: Blues for Two (Pablo, 1983) with Joe Pass
 1983: On The Korner (Pablo, 1994) – the last recording at The Keystone Korner
 1983: Suddenly It's Spring (Pablo, 1983)
 1984: Quietly There: Zoot Sims Plays Johnny Mandel (Pablo, 1984) – compositions of Johnny Mandel

Compilations 
 The Best of Zoot Sims (Pablo, 1980)
 That Old Feeling (Chess, 1995) – double–issue CD of two 1956 albums: Zoot and Zoot Sims Plays Alto, Tenor, and Baritone

As sideman 

With Pepper Adams
 Pepper Adams Plays the Compositions of Charlie Mingus (Workshop Jazz, 1964) – recorded in 1963
 Encounter! (Prestige, 1969) – recorded in 1968

With Chet Baker
 Chet Baker & Strings (Columbia, 1954) – recorded in 1953-54
 Chet Baker Plays the Best of Lerner and Loewe (Riverside, 1959)

With Count Basie
 The Bosses with Big Joe Turner (Pablo, 1973)
 Count Basie Jam (Gruppo Editoriale Fabbri, 1981) – recorded in 1977

With Al Cohn
 The Sax Section (Epic, 1956)
 Son of Drum Suite (RCA Victor, 1960)
 Jazz Mission to Moscow (Colpix, 1962)

With Quincy Jones
 This Is How I Feel About Jazz (ABC-Paramount, 1957) – recorded in 1956-57
 The Birth of a Band! (Mercury, 1959)
 Quincy Jones Explores the Music of Henry Mancini (Mercury, 1964)
 Quincy Plays for Pussycats (Mercury, 1965) – recorded in 1959-65

With Stan Kenton
 Portraits on Standards (Capitol, 1953)
 The Kenton Era (Capitol, 1955) – recorded in 1940-54

With Carmen McRae
 Something to Swing About (Kapp, 1960) – recorded in 1959
 Ms. Jazz (Groove Merchant, 1974) – recorded in 1973

With Gerry Mulligan
 California Concerts (Pacific Jazz, 1955) – recorded in 1954
 Presenting the Gerry Mulligan Sextet (EmArcy, 1955)
 Mainstream of Jazz (EmArcy, 1956)
 A Profile of Gerry Mulligan (EmArcy, 1959) – recorded in 1955-56
 The Arranger (1946-1957) (Columbia, 1977) – recorded in 1946-57
 The Gerry Mulligan Songbook (World Pacific, 1958) – recorded in 1957
 The Concert Jazz Band (Verve, 1960)
 Gerry Mulligan and the Concert Jazz Band on Tour (Verve, 1962) – recorded in 1960
 Something Borrowed – Something Blue (Limelight, 1966)

With Oliver Nelson
 Encyclopedia of Jazz (Verve, 1967) – recorded in 1965-66
 The Sound of Feeling (Verve, 1968) – recorded in 1966-67

With Sarah Vaughan
 Vaughan and Violins (Mercury, 1959) – recorded in 1958
 The Duke Ellington Songbook, Vol. 1 (Pablo, 1979)
 Linger Awhile: Live at Newport and More (Pablo, 2000) – recorded in 1957-82

With Joe Williams
 At Newport '63 (RCA Victor, 1963)
 Having The Blues Under European Sky (Denon, 1985) – live recorded in 1970s

With Others
 Trigger Alpert, Trigger Happy! (Riverside, 1956)
 Louie Bellson, Louis Bellson Quintet (Norgran, 1955) – recorded in 1954
 Clifford Brown, Jazz Immortal (Pacific Jazz, 2001) – recorded in 1954
 Ray Charles, The Genius of Ray Charles (Atlantic, 1959)
 The Kenny Clarke/Francy Boland Big Band, Jazz Is Universal (Atlantic, 1962) – recorded in 1961
 Chris Connor, Chris Connor (Atlantic, 1956)
 Miles Davis, Plays Al Cohn Compositions (Miles Davis and Horns CD) (Prestige, 1956) – recorded in 1953
 Kenny Dorham, Hot Stuff From Brazil (West Wind, 1990) – recorded in 1961
 Jon Eardley, The Jon Eardley Seven (Prestige, 1956) – reissued as Zoot Sims Koo Koo (Status, 1965)
 Booker Ervin, The Book Cooks (Bethlehem, 1961) – recorded in 1960
 Bill Evans, Loose Blues (Milestone, 1982) – recorded in 1962
 Art Farmer, The Aztec Suite (United Artists, 1959)
 Curtis Fuller, South American Cookin' (Epic, 1961)
 Benny Goodman, Benny Goodman in Moscow (RCA Victor, 1962)
 Bobby Hackett, Creole Cookin' (Verve, 1967)
 Coleman Hawkins, The Hawk in Hi Fi with Billy Byers and his orchestra (RCA Victor, 1956)
 Woody Herman, New Big Herd At The Monterey Jazz Festival (Atlantic, 1960) – recorded in 1959
 Jutta Hipp, Jutta Hipp with Zoot Sims (Blue Note, 1957) – recorded in 1956
 Chubby Jackson, All Star Big Band (Prestige, 1950)
 Jack Kerouac, Blues and Haikus (Hanover-Signature, 1959) – recorded in 1958
 Irene Kral, SteveIreneo! (United Artists, 1959)
 Elliot Lawrence, Big Band Modern (Jazztone, 1957)
 Michel Legrand, After The Rain (Pablo, 1983) – recorded in 1982
 Stan Levey and Red Mitchell, West Coast Rhythm (Affinity, 1982) – recorded in 1954-55
 The Manhattan Transfer, The Manhattan Transfer (Atlantic, 1975)
 Gary McFarland, Profiles (Impulse!, 1966)
 Ted McNabb, Big Band Swing (Epic, 1960) – recorded in 1959
 The Metronome All-Stars, Metronome All-Stars 1956 (Clef, 1956)
 Charles Mingus, The Complete Town Hall Concert (Blue Note, 1994) – recorded in 1962
 Red Mitchell, Happy Minors (Bethlehem, 1955) also with Bob Brookmeyer – recorded in 1954
 Jack Montrose, Arranged by Montrose (Pacific Jazz, 1955) – recorded in 1954
 Anita O'Day, All the Sad Young Men (Verve, 1962) – recorded in 1961
 Bob Prince, Saxes Inc. (Warner Bros, 1959)
 Buddy Rich and Lionel Hampton, Transition (Groove Merchant, 1974)
 Shorty Rogers, Shorty Rogers Courts the Count (RCA Victor, 1954)
 Jimmy Rushing, The You And Me That Used To Be (RCA, 1971)
 Lalo Schifrin and Bob Brookmeyer, Samba Para Dos (Verve, 1963)
 Johnny Smith, Moonlight in Vermont (Roost, 1956) – recorded in 1952-53
 Phoebe Snow, Phoebe Snow (Shelter, 1974) – recorded in 1973
 Sonny Stitt, Broadway Soul (Colpix, 1965)
 Clark Terry, Mother ! Mother ! (Pablo, 1980) – recorded in 1979
 Joe Venuti, The Joe Venuti Blue Four (Chiaroscuro, 1974)
 Chuck Wayne, The Jazz Guitarist (Savoy, 1956) – recorded in 1953

References

External links
 
 
Downbeat Magazine article, April 13, 1961.

Hard bop saxophonists
Cool jazz saxophonists
American jazz tenor saxophonists
American male saxophonists
1925 births
1985 deaths
Jazz musicians from California
Musicians from Inglewood, California
People from Queens, New York
Deaths from cancer in New York (state)
Prestige Records artists
Muse Records artists
Pablo Records artists
MCA Records artists
RCA Records artists
Impulse! Records artists
Riverside Records artists
Savoy Records artists
Benny Goodman Orchestra members
20th-century American musicians
20th-century saxophonists
Jazz musicians from New York (state)
20th-century American male musicians
American male jazz musicians
Kenny Clarke/Francy Boland Big Band members
HighNote Records artists
Nagel-Heyer Records artists
Sonet Records artists